Phanagenia is a genus of spider wasp in the tribe Ageniellini, a member of the family Pompilidae. The genus has only one species in North America, Phanagenia bombycina.

Description
Wasps in the genus Phanagenia are small, thin, and wiry. Adults range from 5 mm to 15 mm. Most are black, including Phanagenia bombycina, with iridescent black wings.

Habitat 
Woodlands and woodland edges, where adults rarely visit flowers.

Nest
Nests and nest provisions are similar to those of other Ageniellini, such as Auplopus, Ageniella, and Eragenia.

References

Hymenoptera genera
Pepsinae